Events in the year 1883 in Brazil.

Incumbents
Monarch – Pedro II
Prime Minister – Marquis of Paranaguá (until 24 May), Lafayette Rodrigues Pereira (from 24 May)

Events
January 21 - Elias Augusto da Silva launches the Reformador, a revision of the Federação Espírita Brasileira. 
July 24 - Campos dos Goytacazes, in the province of Rio de Janeiro, is the first city  in Brazil to have street lights.
September 30 - Mossoró, in the province of Rio Grande do Norte, is the first city in Brazil to abolish slavery.

Births
May 18 - Eurico Gaspar Dutra, minister of war 1936-1945, president 1946-1951
June 20 - Oliveira Viana, historian and jurist
October 22 - Abílio Barreto, poet
November 27 - Belfort Duarte, footballer

Deaths
April 11 - Arsênio da Silva, painter and photographer
May 1 - Qorpo-Santo (real name José Joaquim de Campos Leão), journalist and playwright

References

 
1880s in Brazil
Years of the 19th century in Brazil
Brazil
Brazil